Arthur Jerard Weaver (November 18, 1873 – October 18, 1945) was an American politician in the U.S. state of  Nebraska. A Republican, he served as the 22nd Governor of Nebraska.

Weaver was born near Falls City, Nebraska. He was educated at Wyoming Seminary in Pennsylvania and he earned an undergraduate degree in 1895 and a law degree in 1896 from the University of Nebraska. He was a founding member of the Beta Tau Chapter of the Delta Tau Delta fraternity at the University of Nebraska-Lincoln in 1894. He was married to Maude E. Hart on September 2, 1908.

Career
After his graduation from the University of Nebraska, Weaver opened his own practice in Falls City, Nebraska. He was city attorney from 1899 to 1902 and county attorney from 1902 to 1903. In 1904 he suspended his practice to concentrate on his farming and stock-raising interests.  He served on the city council and was elected mayor of Falls City in 1915.

Weaver was elected to the Nebraska House of Representatives in 1899. He was a delegate to the state constitutional convention in 1919 to 1920, and served as president of that body; a presidential elector for Nebraska in 1920.

Weaver ran for Governor of Nebraska in 1928 and won, serving from 1929 to 1931. During his tenure, the entire country was suffering from the Wall Street stock market crash.   After losing re-election in 1930, he returned to Falls City.
He was a delegate to the 1932 Republican National Convention and chair of the Richardson County Republican Party in 1940.

Death
Weaver died in his home in Falls City on October 18, 1945, shortly after suffering a stroke. He is interred at Steele Cemetery in Falls City, Nebraska.

References

External links
 
 Encyclopedia of Nebraska
 National Governors Association
 

1873 births
1945 deaths
People from Falls City, Nebraska
University of Nebraska College of Law alumni
Republican Party governors of Nebraska
Nebraska city council members
Mayors of places in Nebraska
Republican Party members of the Nebraska House of Representatives
Wyoming Seminary alumni